The Teign Valley Group is a late Devonian to late/middle Carboniferous lithostratigraphic group (a sequence of rock strata) in north Cornwall through Devon and into west Somerset in southwest England. The name is derived from the valley of the River Teign. The Group comprises (in ascending order i.e. oldest first) the Barras Nose, Trambley Cove, Teign Chert and Dowhills Mudstone formations. It also includes the Brendon and St Mellion formations whose stratigraphical context is unclear since all known boundaries of these two unit are tectonic. The Brendon Formation slates extend from Tavistock west to Bodmin Moor. The St Mellion Formation sandstones, siltsones and mudstones are found from Holne northeastwards. The Teign Valley Group was formerly known as the Lower Culm Group or Lower Culm Measures.

References

Carboniferous System of Europe
Devonian System of Europe
Geology of England
Geological groups of the United Kingdom